Job Johannes "Joop" Gouweleeuw (5 September 1940 – 29 January 2017) was a Dutch judoka. He competed in 93 kg event at the 1965 and 1966 European Judo Championships, winning a silver and gold medal, respectively. He also competed at the 1964 Summer Olympics in Tokyo. He was born in Delft, South Holland.

Gouweleeuw died on 29 January 2017 in Delft, at the age of 76.

Achievements

References

External links
 

1940 births
2017 deaths
Dutch male judoka
Judoka at the 1964 Summer Olympics
Sportspeople from Delft
Olympic judoka of the Netherlands